The Progressive International is an international organization uniting and mobilizing progressive left-wing activists and organizations.

Origins
It was launched after the Democracy in Europe Movement (DiEM25) and The Sanders Institute announced an open call for progressive forces to form a unified front. The call was announced at a Sanders Institute event in Burlington, Vermont attended by progressive politicians, economists and activists including Naomi Klein, Cornel West, Fernando Haddad, Niki Ashton and Ada Colau.

Formally founded and launched on 11 May 2020 during the global COVID-19 pandemic, the International claims to counter what it calls the resurgence of authoritarian nationalism worldwide as well as the rise of disaster capitalism.

Progressive International held its inaugural summit titled „Internationalism or Extinction” in September 2020, bringing together Council members, trade unions, social movements, and political parties across continents with Noam Chomsky delivering the keynote speech.

Positions
In October 2020, Progressive International said that it was „particularly concerned about the integrity of the presidential elections in Bolivia„ and sent an observer group made up of Members of Parliament from around Europe to observe the election.

Lewica Razem left Progressive International in March 2022 due what Razem claimed was "the absence of declaration recognising Ukraine’s sovereignty and an absolute condemnation of Russian imperialism".

Belmarsh Tribunal
On 2 October 2020, Progressive International launched the Belmarsh Tribunal to put the United States government on trial for war crimes conducted in the 21st century and "drawing attention to the extradition case of Julian Assange for revealing them." The tribunal was modelled after the 1966 Russell-Sartre Tribunal, which investigated American involvement in the Vietnam War.

Member parties

References

External links
Official website

 
Left-wing internationals
Organizations established in 2018